This glossary of astronomy is a list of definitions of terms and concepts relevant to astronomy and cosmology, their sub-disciplines, and related fields. Astronomy is concerned with the study of celestial objects and phenomena that originate outside the atmosphere of Earth. The field of astronomy features an extensive vocabulary and a significant amount of jargon.

A

B

C

D

E

F

G

H

I

J

K

L

M

N

O

P

Q

R

S

T

U

V

W

X

Z

See also

Outline of astronomy
List of astronomical catalogues
List of astronomy acronyms
List of common astronomy symbols
Modern constellations

References

External links

Astronomy

Wikipedia glossaries using description lists